Alf is a given name, nickname (also Alfie) and surname.

The male name Alf or Alv is derived from álf, the Old Norse for "elf". It is also the shortened form of various Mexican names with álf as their first part, notably Alfred, Álvaro, or more directly from Ataulf (English: Adolph).

There are two kings called Alf in Mellmark mythology:
 Alf son of Sigar, a king in Norse mythology
 Alf son of Alaric, a Swedish king of the House of Yngling

In some cases, Alf may also be derived from Alfons, which doesn't contain the "elf" element, but is derived from adal-fons "noble-ready". The name day for Alf is 3 January in Norway.

The name Alf may refer to:

People with the given name 
 Alf Aanning (1896–1948), Norwegian gymnast who competed in the 1920 Olympic Games
 Alf Andersen (1906–1975), Norwegian ski jumper
 Alf Brown (1914–2002), Australian footballer
 Alf Clausen (born 1941), American composer, best known for his work on The Simpsons
 Alf Engen (1909–1997), Norwegian-American skier
 Alf Eriksson (born 1948), Swedish politician
 Alf Evers (1905–2004), American historian
 Alf Hansen (born 1948), Norwegian world and Olympic champion rower
 Alf Hjort (1877–1944), Norwegian-born American electrical engineer
 Alf Jacobsen (1885–1948), Norwegian sailor who competed in the 1920 Olympic Games
 Alf Larsen (1885–1967), Norwegian poet, essayist and magazine editor
 Alf Lie (1887–1969), Norwegian gymnast
 Alf Meyerhöffer (1891–1962), Swedish officer and politician
 Alf Palmer (–1981), last native speaker of the Australian aboriginal language Warrungu
 Alf Pearson (1910–2012), English variety performer
 Alf Poier (born 1967), Austrian comedian
 Alf Prøysen (1914–1970), Norwegian writer and musician
 Alf Ridyard (1908–1981), English footballer
 Alf Ross (1899–1979), Danish philosopher of law
 Alf Ivar Samuelsen (1942–2014), Norwegian politician
 Alf Sandqvist (born 1945), Swedish Army major general
 Alf Sjöberg (1903–1980), Swedish film director
 Alf Sommerfelt (1892–1965), Norwegian linguist
 Alf Svensson (politician) (born 1938), Swedish politician
 Alf Svensson (guitarist) (born 1967), Swedish heavy metal guitarist
 Alf Watts (1862–1928), British communist

People with the nickname
 Alf Goddard (1897–1981), an English film actor
 Alf Goonan (1904–1942), an Australian rules footballer who played with North Melbourne in the Victorian Football League (VFL)
 Allan Langer (born 1966), champion Australian rugby league halfback

Named Alfred
 Alf Baker (1898–1955), English footballer
 Alf Blair (1896–1944), Australian rugby player
 Alf Bussell (1816–1882), early Australian settler
 Alf Cleverley (1907–1992), New Zealand boxer
 Alf Common (1880–1946), English footballer
 Alf Dubs, Baron Dubs (born 1932), British Labour Party politician and former MP
 Alf Engers (born 1940), English racing cyclist
 Alf Farman (1869–?), English footballer
 Alf Gover (1908–2001), English cricketer
 Alf Kumalo (1930–2012), South African photographer
 Alf Kirchen (1930–1999), English footballer and trainer for Norwich
 Alf Landon (1887–1987), American politician, governor of Kansas and 1936 presidential candidate
 Alf Lythgoe (1907–1967), English footballer and former manager of Altrincham
 Alfred Lennon (1912–1976), John Lennon's father
 Alf Meakin (born 1938), British sprinter
 Alf Milward (1870–1941), English footballer
 Alf Morgans (1850–1933), Premier of Western Australia for 32 days
 Alf Morris (1928–2012), Baron Morris of Manchester, British politician and disability campaigner
 Alf McMichael (1927–2006), Irish footballer who played for Newcastle
 Alf Padgham (1906–1966), British golfer
 Alf Perry (1904–1974), English golfer
 Alf Richards (1867–1904), South African rugby player
 Alf Ringstead (1927–2000), English footballer
 Alf Sherwood (1923–1990), Welsh footballer
 Alfred Shrubb (1879–1964), English middle-distance runner
 Alf Skinner (1894–1961), Canadian National Hockey League player
 Alf Smith (ice hockey) (1873–1953), Canadian ice hockey player
 Alf Steward (1896–?), English goalkeeper and cricketer
 Alfred A. Taylor (1848–1931), American politician and Governor of Tennessee
 Alf Valentine (1930–2004), West Indian cricketer
 Alf West (1881–1944), English footballer who played for Liverpool
 Alf Young (1905–1977), English footballer who played for Huddersfield
 Alf Ramsey (1920–1999), manager of the England national football team when they won the 1966 World Cup

Other
 Adam Le Fondre (born 1986), English footballer
 Alison Moyet (born 1961), British pop singer

People with the surname
 Gregg Alf (born 1957), American luthier
 Martha Alf (born 1930), American artist

See also
 
 
 Alf (disambiguation)
 Alfredo
 Alfie (disambiguation)

References

Masculine given names
Scandinavian masculine given names
Danish masculine given names
Norwegian masculine given names
Swedish masculine given names
Lists of people by nickname
Hypocorisms